François Binet (4 May 1880 – 2 December 1930) was a French politician. He served as Minister of Agriculture from April to July 1926 in Aristide Briand's ninth government.

He was a member of the  Chambre des députés from 1908 to 1928.

References

External links 
 Jean Joly (ed.), Dictionnaire des parlementaires français (1889-1940), PUF, 1960

Members of the 9th Chamber of Deputies of the French Third Republic
1930 deaths
French Ministers of Agriculture
French Senators of the Third Republic
20th-century French lawyers
Members of the 10th Chamber of Deputies of the French Third Republic
Members of the 12th Chamber of Deputies of the French Third Republic
Members of the 13th Chamber of Deputies of the French Third Republic